Silz is a municipality in Südliche Weinstraße district, in Rhineland-Palatinate, western Germany.

Silz is home to the Südliche Weinstraße Wildlife Park which attracts about 100,000 visitors a year.

References

Municipalities in Rhineland-Palatinate
Palatinate Forest